The 2011 Denver Outlaws season was the sixth season for the team. Attempting to improve from their 8-4 record and avenge their loss in the semifinal in the previous season, the Outlaws finished with a 7-5 record and returned to the playoffs for the sixth consecutive year but would lose in the semifinal against the Hamilton Nationals by the score of 11-9.

Offseason
In mid-January, Brian Reese stepped down as head coach and general manager. It was later announced that associate head coach and defensive coordinator, Tom Slate, would be named the team's new coach. Reese left with a record of 32-17, a .653 winning percentage.

2011 Draft

The following are the eight picks made by the Outlaws in the 2011 MLL Draft.

Regular season

Postseason

Standings

References

External links
 Team Website 

2011 in lacrosse
Denver Outlaws seasons
Denver Outlaws